Lois Elaine Winstone (born 1982) is an English actress and musician. Her younger sister Jaime is also an actress. She has had parts in both Holby City and The Bill, as well as in several films.

Early life
Winstone is the eldest daughter of English actor Ray Winstone and his wife, Elaine McCausland. She was born in London, attending Enfield County School. Later, the family moved to Roydon, Essex. She returned to the London Borough of Enfield to attend Southgate College, where she studied art.

Acting career
Her first major acting role was an uncredited part in Gary Oldman's 1997 drama Nil by Mouth, alongside her father. Lois would again appear with her father in 2001's Last Orders, this time playing the role of Kath. She appeared in four episodes of The Bill in 2002, playing Chloe Kendrick. Two years later in 2004 she appeared in the "Night Fever" episode of Holby City.

In 2004, she appeared alongside her father again, in Everything. 2005 saw Lois appear in the TV film Perfect Day. In 2006, Winstone played the role of Kirsty in the TV mini-series, When Evil Calls. She described her character as "a gothic schoolgirl lesbian". In 2007, she played Lilith in Beyond the Rave. In 2011 she appeared in the British indie film, The Hot Potato, alongside her father. In 2014, she appeared in two episodes of Game of Thrones, season 4, as the "Mole's Town whore."

Modelling career
Winstone is the face and body of the Ann Summers Spring Summer 2009 Enchantment lingerie collection.

Music career
Winstone is currently in Lois & The Love. Winstone is part of electro pop group This Year's Model, brain child of Manchester techno guru DNCN. She also goes by the stage name "Baby Bo" as part of the London-based hip hop trio Crack Village. She describes joining the group as "a fluke".

References

External links
 

English film actresses
English television actresses
English women singers
Living people
1982 births
Actresses from London
People from Roydon, Essex
People from the London Borough of Enfield
21st-century English actresses